Washington Zeballos Gámez (born 22 December 1954) is a Peruvian politician and a former Congressman representing Moquegua for the 2006–2011 term. Zeballos belongs to the Union for Peru party. He would later switch to Possible Peru. Zeballos lost his seat in the 2011 elections when he ran unsuccessfully for re-election under the Possible Peru Alliance.

External links

Official Congressional Site

Living people
21st-century Peruvian politicians
Union for Peru politicians
Possible Peru politicians
Members of the Congress of the Republic of Peru
1954 births

Place of birth missing (living people)